Helen Lowell born Helen Lowell Robb (1866–1937) was an American stage and film actress.

Life
Lowell was born in New York on June 2, 1866, to William and Mary Robb. In 1884 she debuted in the title role of Iolanthe at the Academy of Music in New York. At the age of 21 her mother died. She was known for playing the role of Mrs. Errol in Little Lord Fauntleroy. In 1895 she played Charlotte Corday. She appeared in J.M.Barrie's
Quality Street creating the role of Susan Throssell in the first New York production with Maude Adams, who starred as Phoebe Throssell (ibdb.com).

In October 1903 she appeared in the stage version Mrs. Wiggs of the Cabbage Patch in Louisville, Kentucky. She was able to tour to Australia, New Zealand, Hawaii and across America for the next seven years playing Miss Hazy "in the Cabbage Patch".

She had a successful career as a stage comedienne, appearing on Broadway in The Torch-Bearers (1922), before she went to Hollywood in 1934 where she appeared in Side Streets which was a Warner Bros film. She became known as the first choice for playing middle aged women.

On June 29, 1937, Lowell was found dead in her hotel room in Hollywood.

Theater
Little Lord Fauntleroy
Mrs. Wiggs of the Cabbage Patch as Miss Hazey
Cappy

Selected filmography
 Side Streets (1934) - as Tillie
 The Merry Frinks (1934) - as Grandma Frink
 Party Wire (1935) - as Nettie Putnam
 The Goose and the Gander (1935) - as Aunt Julia
 Strike Me Pink (1936) - as Hattie 'Ma' Carson 
 I'd Give My Life (1936) - as Mrs. Bancroft, Sr.
 Wild Brian Kent (1936) - Aunt Sue Prentice
 Four Days' Wonder (1936)
 Snowed Under (1936) - as Mrs. Canterbury
 Michael O'Halloran (1937) - as Hettie

References

Bibliography
 Goble, Alan. The Complete Index to Literary Sources in Film. Walter de Gruyter, 1999.

External links

1866 births
1937 deaths
American film actresses
American stage actresses
20th-century American actresses